Ruth: Justice Ginsburg in Her Own Words is an 2019 American documentary film, directed and produced by Freida Lee Mock, written by Mock and M.A. Golán. It follows Ruth Bader Ginsburg, the second female Supreme Court of the United States Associate Justice.

The film had its world premiere at AFI Docs on June 22, 2019. It was released through virtual cinema on February 12, 2021, followed by video on demand on March 9, 2021, by Kino Lorber and Virgil Films.

Synopsis
The film follows Ruth Bader Ginsburg, the second female Supreme Court of the United States Associate Justice. Goodwin Liu, Erwin Chemerinsky, Irin Carmon, Shana Knizhnik, Jennifer Carroll Foy, M.E. Freeman, Lilly Ledbetter and Kathleen Peratis appear in the film.

Production
In 2015, Regina K. Scully and Geralyn Dreyfous approached Freida Lee Mock about making a documentary film revolving around Ruth Bader Ginsburg. Mock agreed and wrote to Bader Ginsburg who stated to wait until On the Basis of Sex had been released. Principal photography on the film began in mid-2017, with Mock conducing hours of research and going through hundreds of hours of footage of Ginsburg to shape the film.

Release
The film had its world premiere at AFI Docs on June 22, 2019. In September 2020, it was announced the film was being screened digitally to various film distributors, with the goal of having the film released prior to the 2020 United States presidential election. In January 2021, Virgil Films and Kino Lorber acquired U.S. distribution rights to the film, and set it for a virtual cinema release on February 12, 2021, prior to video on demand on March 9, 2021. That same month, Starz acquired television rights to the film, and broadcast it on March 1, 2021.

Reception
The site's critical consensus reads, "This assembly of archival footage doesn't distinguish itself from other documentaries about Ruth Bader Ginsburg's life, but it does offer a heartfelt glimpse into her judicial philosophy In Her Own Words." On Metacritic, the film holds a rating of 58 out of 100, based on 4 critics, indicating "mixed or average reviews".

References

External links
 
 
 
 

2019 films
American documentary films
2019 documentary films
Biographical documentary films
Documentary films about feminism
Documentary films about lawyers
Documentary films about misogyny
Documentary films about women
Ruth Bader Ginsburg
2010s English-language films
2010s American films